Jason Smart is an Australian Paralympic athlete.  He won a  gold medal at the 1988 Seoul Games in the Men's 4 × 100 m Relay A2A4-7 event.

References

Paralympic athletes of Australia
Athletes (track and field) at the 1988 Summer Paralympics
Paralympic gold medalists for Australia
Living people
Medalists at the 1988 Summer Paralympics
Year of birth missing (living people)
Paralympic medalists in athletics (track and field)
Australian male wheelchair racers